Alfred Mervyn Wall (1 November 1889 – 2 October 1957) was a British trade unionist and political activist.

Born in East Hamlet, Shropshire on 1 November 1889, Wall moved to London to work as a compositor, and was a member of the British Socialist Party (BSP).  This affiliated to the Labour Party after World War I, and Wall was unexpectedly elected to Wandsworth Metropolitan Borough Council for Clapham North in 1918.  In this role, he frequently clashed with the local socialist preacher and pioneer druid George Watson Macgregor Reid.  He was also sympathetic to anarchism, and chaired the Frank Kitz Appeal Committee.

Wall represented the BSP's Clapham branch at the meeting which founded the Communist Party of Great Britain (CPGB), and subsequently sat as a Communist councillor.  Initially one of the communist's main speakers in London, he stood as a joint Communist Party-Labour Party candidate in Streatham at the 1924 general election, taking 13.8% of the vote.

Wall represented the London Society of Compositors at the Labour Party conference in 1925, and eventually defected to the party, although he was still a communist in 1927, when he became a joint secretary of the "Hands Off China" campaign.  In 1926, he was elected as Secretary of the London Trades Council.  While holding this position, he spent much of his time promoting a trade union for actors, based on a closed shop principle.  This became Equity, and he was elected as its first secretary.  Later in the 1930s, he also served as a vice-president of the Spanish Medical Aid Committee,

In 1938, Wall was elected as General Secretary of the London Society of Compositors, and stood down from the London Trades Council.  During World War II, he served on the National Arbitration Union, and on Lord Swinton's Security Executive.

Wall retired from his union posts in 1945, but worked for a while as the secretary and welfare officer of C. and E. Layton.

References

1889 births
1957 deaths
British Socialist Party members
Communist Party of Great Britain councillors
Councillors in Greater London
Labour Party (UK) councillors
Labour Party (UK) parliamentary candidates
General Secretaries of the London Typographical Association
General Secretaries of Equity (trade union)
20th-century British businesspeople